Ravi Walia (born April 7, 1973 in New Westminster, British Columbia) is a Canadian figure skating coach and former competitor. He is the 1995 Canadian national bronze medallist and the 1993 Canadian national junior champion, representing the Kerrisdale Figure Skating Club, where he was coached by Dr. Hellmut May. He was later coached by Jan Ullmark and Cynthia Ullmark at The Royal Glenora Club in Edmonton, Alberta.

Walia serves as an ISU Technical Specialist for Canada. He has coached several national and international champions and began coaching Kaetlyn Osmond when she was ten years old. Osmond is the 2018 Olympic bronze medallist, 2018 Olympic team gold medallist, 2018 World gold medallist, 2017 World silver medallist, 2014 Olympic team silver medallist, and a three-time Canadian national champion.  In 2017, Walia began coaching Patrick Chan and coached him to a tenth Canadian national title and an Olympic team gold medal.

In 2013 and 2018, Walia was awarded Skate Canada's "Competitive Coach Award of Excellence".  In 2014, 2017, and 2018, he was awarded the "Petro-Canada Coaching Excellence Award".

Competitive highlights 
GP: Champions Series (Grand Prix)

References

1973 births
Canadian male single skaters
Living people
International Skating Union technical specialists
Sportspeople from New Westminster
Canadian figure skating coaches
Canadian people of Indian descent
Canadian people of Punjabi descent
Punjabi people
Ahluwalia
20th-century Canadian people
21st-century Canadian people